Mount Light may refer to:

Mount Light (Antarctica), mountain in Antarctica
Mount Light, South Australia, locality in Australia